Kieren Duncan (born October 12, 1993) is a former American football wide receiver. He played college football at CSU–Pueblo. He has also been a member of the Chicago Bears and Winnipeg Blue Bombers.

Professional career
Duncan was signed by the Chicago Bears after going undrafted in the 2016 NFL Draft. On August 28, 2016, Duncan was waived by the Bears. Duncan participated in the Winnipeg Blue Bombers 2017 training camp, but did not make the final roster. Duncan was signed by the BC Lions on February 22, 2018. He was released before the start of the regular season on May 1, 2018. He signed with the Ottawa Redblacks on May 20, and released on June 10.

References

Further reading

1993 births
Living people
People from Maricopa County, Arizona
Sportspeople from the Phoenix metropolitan area
Players of American football from Arizona
American football wide receivers
CSU Pueblo ThunderWolves football players
Chicago Bears players
BC Lions players
Ottawa Redblacks players